Goslar – Northeim – Osterode is an electoral constituency (German: Wahlkreis) represented in the Bundestag. It elects one member via first-past-the-post voting. Under the current constituency numbering system, it is designated as constituency 52. It is located in southern Lower Saxony, comprising most of the districts of Goslar, Northeim, and the former Osterode (now part of Göttingen district).

Goslar – Northeim – Osterode was created for the inaugural 1949 federal election. Since 2021, it has been represented by Frauke Heiligenstadt of the Social Democratic Party (SPD).

Geography
Goslar – Northeim – Osterode is located in southern Lower Saxony. As of the 2021 federal election, it comprises the district of Goslar excluding the Samtgemeinde of Lutter am Barenberge and municipalities of Langelsheim, Liebenburg, and Seesen; the district of Northeim excluding the municipalities of Bodenfelde and Uslar and Solling area; and the area of the now-abolished district of Osterode excluding the municipalities of Bad Lauterberg, Bad Sachsa, and Herzberg am Harz (now part of the Göttingen district).

History
Goslar – Northeim – Osterode was created in 1949, then known as Northeim – Einbeck – Duderstadt. In the 1965 through 1976 elections, it was named Northeim. In the 1980 through 1998 elections, it was named Northeim – Osterode. It acquired its current name in the 2002 election. In the inaugural Bundestag election, it was Lower Saxony constituency 33 in the numbering system. From 1953 through 1961, it was number 55. From 1965 through 1998, it was number 48. In the 2002 and 2005 elections, it was number 52. In the 2009 election, it was number 53. Since the 2013 election, it has been number 52.

Originally, the constituency comprised the districts of Northeim, Einbeck, and Duderstadt. In the 1965 through 1976 elections, it comprised the district of Northeim excluding the Fürstenhagen municipality, as well as the districts of Osterode, Blankenburg, and Zellerfeld. In the 1980 through 1998 elections, it comprised the district of Northeim and the municipalities of Osterode am Harz and Herzberg am Harz and the Samtgemeinden of Bad Grund and Hattorf from the Osterode district. It acquired its current borders in the 2002 election.

Members
The constituency has been held by the Social Democratic Party (SPD) during all but two Bundestag terms since 1949. Its first representative was Martin Schmidt of the SPD, who served from 1949 to 1957. Karl Hackethal of the Christian Democratic Union (CDU) won the constituency in 1957 and served a single term. Former member Schmidt returned in 1961 and served until 1987. He was succeeded by Edith Niehuis, who served until 2002. Wilhelm Priesmeier was then representative until 2017. In 2017, Roy Kühne of the CDU was elected representative. In 2021, Frauke Heiligenstadt regained it for the SPD.

Election results

2021 election

2017 election

2013 election

2009 election

References

Federal electoral districts in Lower Saxony
1949 establishments in West Germany
Constituencies established in 1949